This is a list of Polish television related events from 2001.

Events
3 March - The Polish version of Big Brother debuts on TVN.
17 June - The first series of Big Brother is won by Janusz Dzięcioł.
16 December - Marzena Wieczorek wins the second series of Big Brother.

Debuts
3 March - Big Brother (2001-2002, 2007-2008)

Television shows

1990s
Klan (1997–present)

2000s
M jak miłość (2000–present)

Ending this year

Births

Deaths